"Honky Tonkin' (All Night Long)" is a single by Canadian country music artist Dallas Harms. Released in 1982, it was the first single from his album Out of Harms Way. The song reached #1 on the RPM Country Tracks chart in Canada in January 1983.

Chart performance

References

1982 singles
Dallas Harms songs
1982 songs